Erik Ziengs (born 27 September 1960 in Hoogersmilde) is a Dutch politician and former entrepreneur. As a member of the People's Party for Freedom and Democracy (Volkspartij voor Vrijheid en Democratie) he has been an MP since 17 June 2010. He focuses on the matters of SME's, tourism, entrepreneurship and reduction of administrative burdens.

References 
  Parlement.com biography

External links 
  Erik Ziengs personal website
  House of Representatives biography
  People's Party for Freedom and Democracy website

1960 births
Living people
Dutch businesspeople
Members of the House of Representatives (Netherlands)
People from Assen
People from Midden-Drenthe
People's Party for Freedom and Democracy politicians
21st-century Dutch politicians